The Oregon Institute of Technology, Klamath Falls or historically, Oregon Tech, is the largest of the two main campuses that Oregon Tech maintains. At this campus, the university provides a total of 32 degree programs in engineering, health technologies, management, communication, psychology and applied sciences with a total of 37 majors.  In the university's most recent polling, 97% of its graduates are employed or doing graduate studies within 6 months of completing a degree program. Oregon Tech has been judged by PayScale to give the best return on investment (ROI) of any college in the state of Oregon, for both in- and out-of-state students.

History

Oregon Tech was founded as the Oregon Vocational School on July 15, 1947, to train and re-educate returning World War II veterans. Under the direction of Winston Purvine, the first classes were held in a deactivated Marine Corps hospital three miles northeast of Klamath Falls. The following year, the school's title was changed to the Oregon Technical Institute. In the first school year, 1947–1948, veterans constituted 98 percent of student enrollment. By 1950, the figure was 75 percent. In that year, in response to the Korean War, the school received a contract for training soldiers in welding and warehouse management. In 1953, Associate degree programs in Surveying and Structural Engineering Technologies were first accredited by the Engineers Council for Professional Development. The campus was transferred to its current location in 1964, followed by another name change to the Oregon Institute of Technology in 1973.

Academics
For the Fall 2015 academic year, the university received about 2,000 freshman applications.

In 2005, Oregon Tech introduced the first Bachelor of Science degree in Renewable Energy Engineering (REE) offered in North America. The new program uses electrical and mechanical engineering fundamentals in conjunction with upper-division coursework in renewable energy and energy systems.  REE prepares students for careers in the energy sector, especially in relation to renewable energy. The Renewable Energy Engineering degree is offered in both Klamath Falls and Wilsonville.  A Master's degree program is located at the Wilsonville campus.

Rankings and recognition 
Oregon Tech earned a spot among 650 other four-year baccalaureate colleges in the Forbes 2012 America's Best Colleges list. Forbes in 2015 rated Oregon Tech #98 among all West Coast universities and considers it to be "innovative." In 2020, U.S. News ranked it #6 in Regional Colleges West, #4 in Best Colleges for Veterans and #12 in Best Value Schools.

Campus 

The present Klamath Falls Oregon Tech campus overlooks Upper Klamath Lake, and is directly adjacent to Sky Lakes Medical Center. The physical location of the school often elicits a favorable response with its views of the lake and mountains. Newer buildings such as Purvine Hall, the Martha Anne Dow Center for Health Professions, the College Union, the CEET (Center for Excellence in Engineering and Technology), and the renovated Owens Hall embrace a modern, aesthetically appealing collegiate style. 
Oregon Tech has a residence hall adjacent to the College Union, often referred to as "The Castle" by students because of its concrete appearance and elevated placement. The university opened a second housing unit titled "The Sustainable Village," or just "The Village," adjacent to the original residence hall for the start of the fall term, in 2009.  The Village features an apartment-style complex. Many students live off-campus in the residential area south of the college along North Eldorado Avenue, or elsewhere in Klamath Falls.

Athletics
The Oregon Tech (OIT) athletic teams are called the Owls and Lady Owls (sometimes known as the "Hustlin' Owls"). The institute of technology is a member of the National Association of Intercollegiate Athletics (NAIA), primarily competing in the Cascade Collegiate Conference (CCC) since the 1993–94 academic year.

Oregon Tech competes in 13 intercollegiate varsity sports: Men's sports include baseball, basketball, cross country, golf, soccer and track & field; while women's sports include basketball, cross country, golf, soccer, softball, track & field and volleyball. The mascot for Oregon Tech Athletics is the Hootie the Owl and is a source of pride for many Tech students.

Rivalries
Oregon Tech's traditional athletic nemesis is Southern Oregon University in Ashland, Oregon. The close proximity of the schools and alternate academic foci (science and technology at Oregon Tech, liberal arts at SOU) result in a natural rivalry between the two.

Basketball
Oregon Tech basketball has been consistently competitive in the CCC and at the national level, while earning a somewhat infamous reputation within the conference for its passionate crowds and rowdy student section. In March 2004, the Oregon Tech men's basketball team made school history by winning the NAIA Division II National Championship. They won the NAIA National Championship again in 2008 and 2012. In 2019, the Hustlin' Owls made another run in the NAIA National Tournament finishing as the runner-up to Spring Arbor in the championship game. The Owl's 2019 Tournament run included upsetting the #1 ranked team, and defending National Champion, Indiana Wesleyan 107–93 in the quarterfinals. In the Semifinal round, the Owls defeated conference foe College of Idaho 93–81 to advance to the title game.

National championships
The Oregon Tech men's basketball team won their first NAIA Division II National Championship against Bellevue University of Bellevue, Nebraska 81–72, on March 18, 2004. They won their second national title in a rematch exactly four years later, to the day, against the Bruins from Bellevue, 63–56 in 2008. In 2012 they won their third national title 63–46 against Northwood (Fla.).

Danny Miles
Men's basketball head coach Danny Miles retired after his 46th season at Oregon Tech and had accumulated a 1040–437 record (0.704). This record has earned him the rank of third winningest coach in men's collegiate basketball history at a four-year institution (third to Mike Krzyzewski of Duke University 1071 wins, and Harry Statham of McKendree University with 1110 wins).

In Miles' tenure at Oregon Tech, he achieved three nationals wins, one national runner-up, one national third place, two elite eights, 17 district or conference titles, seven district runners-up, and ten 30 win seasons.  His team has ranked in the NAIA Division 1 or 2 top-20 on 30 occasions and averaged more than 23 wins per season.

Miles earned his 800th win on December 8, 2006, with an 84–73 victory over George Fox University. Miles again, reached a benchmark win at 900 on February 13, 2010, against Southern Oregon University with a final score of 101–76. Danny Miles became just the second men's basketball coach at a four-year level to reach 1,000 career victories on February 1, 2014, with a 71–51 victory over Corban University.

Softball
In 2011 Oregon Tech won their first ever NAIA Softball National Championship.

Football
Oregon Tech first fielded a football team in 1948. The school dropped the football team in 1992 due to budget cuts.

Clubs and activities
The university has many different clubs and activities on campus which operate under the umbrella of the school's student government organization, Associated Students of OIT (ASOIT). Among these are student chapters of professional societies, such as the American Society of Civil Engineers and American Dental Hygienists' Association, Alpha Sigma Alpha sorority, Phi Delta Theta fraternity, Engineers Without Borders, recreational activity programs, special interest groups, cultural awareness organizations, student media, and academic honor societies. Also, Oregon Tech's student chapter of the Society of Automotive Engineers competes in the annual SAE Mini Baja event. The Renewable Energy Engineering program also has a club open to all majors and is working toward becoming a chapter of the Association of Energy Engineers. The Oregon Tech Robotics Club invites students from many majors to collaborate on multidisciplinary robotics projects such as the MATE ROV competition and to support community members in technical projects.

References

External links
 
 OIT athletics website

Universities and colleges accredited by the Northwest Commission on Colleges and Universities
Educational institutions established in 1947
 
Technological universities in the United States
Buildings and structures in Klamath Falls, Oregon
1947 establishments in Oregon
Cascade Collegiate Conference